Natural yttrium (39Y) is composed of a single isotope yttrium-89. The most stable radioisotopes are 88Y, which has a half-life of 106.6 days and 91Y with a half-life of 58.51 days. All the other isotopes have half-lives of less than a day, except 87Y, which has a half-life of 79.8 hours, and 90Y, with 64 hours. The dominant decay mode below the stable 89Y is electron capture and the dominant mode after it is beta emission. Thirty-five unstable isotopes have been characterized.

90Y exists in equilibrium with its parent isotope strontium-90, which is a product of nuclear fission.

List of isotopes 

|-
| 76Y
| style="text-align:right" | 39
| style="text-align:right" | 37
| 75.95845(54)#
| 500# ns [>170 ns]
|
|
|
|
|-
| rowspan=2|77Y
| rowspan=2 style="text-align:right" | 39
| rowspan=2 style="text-align:right" | 38
| rowspan=2|76.94965(7)#
| rowspan=2|63(17) ms
| p (>99.9%)
| 76Sr
| rowspan=2|5/2+#
| rowspan=2|
|-
| β+ (<.1%)
| 77Sr
|-
| 78Y
| style="text-align:right" | 39
| style="text-align:right" | 39
| 77.94361(43)#
| 54(5) ms
| β+
| 78Sr
| (0+)
|
|-
| style="text-indent:1em" | 78mY
| colspan="3" style="text-indent:2em" | 0(500)# keV
| 5.8(5) s
|
|
| 5+#
|
|-
| rowspan=2|79Y
| rowspan=2 style="text-align:right" | 39
| rowspan=2 style="text-align:right" | 40
| rowspan=2|78.93735(48)
| rowspan=2|14.8(6) s
| β+ (>99.9%)
| 79Sr
| rowspan=2|(5/2+)#
| rowspan=2|
|-
| β+, p (<.1%)
| 78Rb
|-
| 80Y
| style="text-align:right" | 39
| style="text-align:right" | 41
| 79.93428(19)
| 30.1(5) s
| β+
| 80Sr
| 4−
|
|-
| style="text-indent:1em" | 80m1Y
| colspan="3" style="text-indent:2em" | 228.5(1) keV
| 4.8(3) s
|
|
| (1−)
|
|-
| style="text-indent:1em" | 80m2Y
| colspan="3" style="text-indent:2em" | 312.6(9) keV
| 4.7(3) µs
|
|
| (2+)
|
|-
| 81Y
| style="text-align:right" | 39
| style="text-align:right" | 42
| 80.92913(7)
| 70.4(10) s
| β+
| 81Sr
| (5/2+)
|
|-
| 82Y
| style="text-align:right" | 39
| style="text-align:right" | 43
| 81.92679(11)
| 8.30(20) s
| β+
| 82Sr
| 1+
|
|-
| style="text-indent:1em" | 82m1Y
| colspan="3" style="text-indent:2em" | 402.63(14) keV
| 268(25) ns
|
|
| 4−
|
|-
| style="text-indent:1em" | 82m2Y
| colspan="3" style="text-indent:2em" | 507.50(13) keV
| 147(7) ns
|
|
| 6+
|
|-
| 83Y
| style="text-align:right" | 39
| style="text-align:right" | 44
| 82.92235(5)
| 7.08(6) min
| β+
| 83Sr
| 9/2+
|
|-
| rowspan=2 style="text-indent:1em" | 83mY
| rowspan=2 colspan="3" style="text-indent:2em" | 61.98(11) keV
| rowspan=2|2.85(2) min
| β+ (60%)
| 83Sr
| rowspan=2|(3/2−)
| rowspan=2|
|-
| IT (40%)
| 83Y
|-
| 84Y
| style="text-align:right" | 39
| style="text-align:right" | 45
| 83.92039(10)
| 39.5(8) min
| β+
| 84Sr
| 1+
|
|-
| style="text-indent:1em" | 84mY
| colspan="3" style="text-indent:2em" | −80(190) keV
| 4.6(2) s
| β+
| 84Sr
| (5−)
|
|-
| 85Y
| style="text-align:right" | 39
| style="text-align:right" | 46
| 84.916433(20)
| 2.68(5) h
| β+
| 85Sr
| (1/2)−
|
|-
| rowspan=2 style="text-indent:1em" | 85m1Y
| rowspan=2 colspan="3" style="text-indent:2em" | 19.8(5) keV
| rowspan=2|4.86(13) h
| β+ (99.998%)
| 85Sr
| rowspan=2|9/2+
| rowspan=2|
|-
| IT (.002%)
| 85Y
|-
| style="text-indent:1em" | 85m2Y
| colspan="3" style="text-indent:2em" | 266.30(20) keV
| 178(6) ns
|
|
| 5/2−
|
|-
| 86Y
| style="text-align:right" | 39
| style="text-align:right" | 47
| 85.914886(15)
| 14.74(2) h
| β+
| 86Sr
| 4−
|
|-
| rowspan=2 style="text-indent:1em" | 86m1Y
| rowspan=2 colspan="3" style="text-indent:2em" | 218.30(20) keV
| rowspan=2|48(1) min
| IT (99.31%)
| 86Y
| rowspan=2|(8+)
| rowspan=2|
|-
| β+ (.69%)
| 86Sr
|-
| style="text-indent:1em" | 86m2Y
| colspan="3" style="text-indent:2em" | 302.2(5) keV
| 125(6) ns
|
|
| (7−)
|
|-
| 87Y
| style="text-align:right" | 39
| style="text-align:right" | 48
| 86.9108757(17)
| 79.8(3) h
| β+
| 87Sr
| 1/2−
|
|-
| rowspan=2 style="text-indent:1em" | 87mY
| rowspan=2 colspan="3" style="text-indent:2em" | 380.82(7) keV
| rowspan=2|13.37(3) h
| IT (98.43%)
| 87Y
| rowspan=2|9/2+
| rowspan=2|
|-
| β+ (1.56%)
| 87Sr
|-
| 88Y
| style="text-align:right" | 39
| style="text-align:right" | 49
| 87.9095011(20)
| 106.616(13) d
| β+
| 88Sr
| 4−
|
|-
| style="text-indent:1em" | 88m1Y
| colspan="3" style="text-indent:2em" | 674.55(4) keV
| 13.9(2) ms
| IT
| 88Y
| (8)+
|
|-
| style="text-indent:1em" | 88m2Y
| colspan="3" style="text-indent:2em" | 392.86(9) keV
| 300(3) µs
|
|
| 1+
|
|-
| 89Y
| style="text-align:right" | 39
| style="text-align:right" | 50
| 88.9058483(27)
| colspan=3 align=center|Stable
| 1/2−
| 1.0000
|-
| style="text-indent:1em" | 89mY
| colspan="3" style="text-indent:2em" | 908.97(3) keV
| 15.663(5) s
| IT
| 89Y
| 9/2+
|
|-
| 90Y
| style="text-align:right" | 39
| style="text-align:right" | 51
| 89.9071519(27)
| 64.053(20) h
| β−
| 90Zr
| 2−
|
|-
| rowspan=2 style="text-indent:1em" | 90mY
| rowspan=2 colspan="3" style="text-indent:2em" | 681.67(10) keV
| rowspan=2|3.19(6) h
| IT (99.99%)
| 90Y
| rowspan=2|7+
| rowspan=2|
|-
| β− (.0018%)
| 90Zr
|-
| 91Y
| style="text-align:right" | 39
| style="text-align:right" | 52
| 90.907305(3)
| 58.51(6) d
| β−
| 91Zr
| 1/2−
|
|-
| rowspan=2 style="text-indent:1em" | 91mY
| rowspan=2 colspan="3" style="text-indent:2em" | 555.58(5) keV
| rowspan=2|49.71(4) min
| IT (98.5%)
| 91Y
| rowspan=2|9/2+
| rowspan=2|
|-
| β− (1.5%)
| 91Zr
|-
| 92Y
| style="text-align:right" | 39
| style="text-align:right" | 53
| 91.908949(10)
| 3.54(1) h
| β−
| 92Zr
| 2−
|
|-
| 93Y
| style="text-align:right" | 39
| style="text-align:right" | 54
| 92.909583(11)
| 10.18(8) h
| β−
| 93Zr
| 1/2−
|
|-
| style="text-indent:1em" | 93mY
| colspan="3" style="text-indent:2em" | 758.719(21) keV
| 820(40) ms
| IT
| 93Y
| 7/2+
|
|-
| 94Y
| style="text-align:right" | 39
| style="text-align:right" | 55
| 93.911595(8)
| 18.7(1) min
| β−
| 94Zr
| 2−
|
|-
| 95Y
| style="text-align:right" | 39
| style="text-align:right" | 56
| 94.912821(8)
| 10.3(1) min
| β−
| 95Zr
| 1/2−
|
|-
| 96Y
| style="text-align:right" | 39
| style="text-align:right" | 57
| 95.915891(25)
| 5.34(5) s
| β−
| 96Zr
| 0−
|
|-
| style="text-indent:1em" | 96mY
| colspan="3" style="text-indent:2em" | 1140(30) keV
| 9.6(2) s
| β−
| 96Zr
| (8)+
|
|-
| rowspan=2|97Y
| rowspan=2 style="text-align:right" | 39
| rowspan=2 style="text-align:right" | 58
| rowspan=2|96.918134(13)
| rowspan=2|3.75(3) s
| β− (99.942%)
| 97Zr
| rowspan=2|(1/2−)
| rowspan=2|
|-
| β−, n (.058%)
| 96Zr
|-
| rowspan=3 style="text-indent:1em" | 97m1Y
| rowspan=3 colspan="3" style="text-indent:2em" | 667.51(23) keV
| rowspan=3|1.17(3) s
| β− (99.3%)
| 97Zr
| rowspan=3|(9/2)+
| rowspan=3|
|-
| IT (.7%)
| 97Y
|-
| β−, n (.08%)
| 96Zr
|-
| style="text-indent:1em" | 97m2Y
| colspan="3" style="text-indent:2em" | 3523.3(4) keV
| 142(8) ms
|
|
| (27/2−)
|
|-
| rowspan=2|98Y
| rowspan=2 style="text-align:right" | 39
| rowspan=2 style="text-align:right" | 59
| rowspan=2|97.922203(26)
| rowspan=2|0.548(2) s
| β− (99.669%)
| 98Zr
| rowspan=2|(0)−
| rowspan=2|
|-
| β−, n (.331%)
| 97Zr
|-
| style="text-indent:1em" | 98m1Y
| colspan="3" style="text-indent:2em" | 170.74(6) keV
| 620(80) ns
|
|
| (2)−
| 
|-
| rowspan=3 style="text-indent:1em" | 98m2Y
| rowspan=3 colspan="3" style="text-indent:2em" | 410(30) keV
| rowspan=3|2.0(2) s
| β− (86.6%)
| 98Zr
| rowspan=3|(5+,4−)
| rowspan=3|
|-
| IT (10%)
| 98Y
|-
| β−, n (3.4%)
| 97Zr
|-
| style="text-indent:1em" | 98m3Y
| colspan="3" style="text-indent:2em" | 496.19(15) keV
| 7.6(4) µs
|
|
| (2−)
|
|-
| style="text-indent:1em" | 98m4Y
| colspan="3" style="text-indent:2em" | 1181.1(4) keV
| 0.83(10) µs
|
|
| (8−)
|
|-
| rowspan=2|99Y
| rowspan=2 style="text-align:right" | 39
| rowspan=2 style="text-align:right" | 60
| rowspan=2|98.924636(26)
| rowspan=2|1.470(7) s
| β− (98.1%)
| 99Zr
| rowspan=2|(5/2+)
| rowspan=2|
|-
| β−, n (1.9%)
| 98Zr
|-
| style="text-indent:1em" | 99mY
| colspan="3" style="text-indent:2em" | 2141.65(19) keV
| 8.6(8) µs
|
|
| (17/2+)
|
|-
| rowspan=2|100Y
| rowspan=2 style="text-align:right" | 39
| rowspan=2 style="text-align:right" | 61
| rowspan=2|99.92776(8)
| rowspan=2|735(7) ms
| β− (98.98%)
| 100Zr
| rowspan=2|1−,2−
| rowspan=2|
|-
| β−, n (1.02%)
| 99Zr
|-
| style="text-indent:1em" | 100mY
| colspan="3" style="text-indent:2em" | 200(200)# keV
| 940(30) ms
| β−
| 100Zr
| (3,4,5)(+#)
|
|-
| rowspan=2|101Y
| rowspan=2 style="text-align:right" | 39
| rowspan=2 style="text-align:right" | 62
| rowspan=2|100.93031(10)
| rowspan=2|426(20) ms
| β− (98.06%)
| 101Zr
| rowspan=2|(5/2+)
| rowspan=2|
|-
| β−, n (1.94%)
| 100Zr
|-
| rowspan=2|102Y
| rowspan=2 style="text-align:right" | 39
| rowspan=2 style="text-align:right" | 63
| rowspan=2|101.93356(9)
| rowspan=2|0.30(1) s
| β− (95.1%)
| 102Zr
| rowspan=2|
| rowspan=2|
|-
| β−, n (4.9%)
| 101Zr
|-
| rowspan=2 style="text-indent:1em" | 102mY
| rowspan=2 colspan="3" style="text-indent:2em" | 200(200)# keV
| rowspan=2|360(40) ms
| β− (94%)
| 102Zr
| rowspan=2|high
| rowspan=2|
|-
| β−, n (6%)
| 101Zr
|-
| rowspan=2|103Y
| rowspan=2 style="text-align:right" | 39
| rowspan=2 style="text-align:right" | 64
| rowspan=2|102.93673(32)#
| rowspan=2|224(19) ms
| β− (91.7%)
| 103Zr
| rowspan=2|5/2+#
| rowspan=2|
|-
| β−, n (8.3%)
| 102Zr
|-
| 104Y
| style="text-align:right" | 39
| style="text-align:right" | 65
| 103.94105(43)#
| 180(60) ms
| β−
| 104Zr
|
|
|-
| 105Y
| style="text-align:right" | 39
| style="text-align:right" | 66
| 104.94487(54)#
| 60# ms [>300 ns]
| β−
| 105Zr
| 5/2+#
|
|-
| 106Y
| style="text-align:right" | 39
| style="text-align:right" | 67
| 105.94979(75)#
| 50# ms [>300 ns]
| β−
| 106Zr
|
|
|-
| 107Y
| style="text-align:right" | 39
| style="text-align:right" | 68
| 106.95414(54)#
| 30# ms [>300 ns]
|
|
| 5/2+#
|
|-
| 108Y
| style="text-align:right" | 39
| style="text-align:right" | 69
| 107.95948(86)#
| 20# ms [>300 ns]
|
|
|
|
|-
| 109Y
| style="text-align:right" | 39
| style="text-align:right" | 70
| 
| 
|
|
|
|
|-
| 110Y
| style="text-align:right" | 39
| style="text-align:right" | 71
| 
|
|
|
|
|-
| 111Y
| style="text-align:right" | 39
| style="text-align:right" | 72
| 
| 
|
|
|
|

References 

 Isotope masses from:

 Isotopic compositions and standard atomic masses from:

 Half-life, spin, and isomer data selected from the following sources.

 
Yttrium
Yttrium